Norton Barracks is a military installation in Norton, Worcestershire. The keep is a Grade II listed building.

History
The barracks were built in the Fortress Gothic Revival Style between 1874 and 1877. Their creation took place as part of the Cardwell Reforms which encouraged the localisation of British military forces. The barracks became the depot for the 29th (Worcestershire) Regiment of Foot and the 36th (Herefordshire) Regiment of Foot. Following the Childers Reforms, the 29th and 36th Regiments amalgamated as the Worcestershire Regiment with its depot in the barracks in 1881. Many recruits were enlisted at the barracks during the early stages of the First World War. A Regimental Museum was established at the barracks in 1933 and the barracks continued to operate as a training facility during the Second World War.

In 1970 the Worcestershire Regiment amalgamated with the Sherwood Foresters to form the Worcestershire and Sherwood Foresters Regiment which established its depot at Battlesbury Barracks in Warminster. The Worcestershire Regiment Museum collection moved to the Worcester City Art Gallery & Museum in 1970. At around the same time 14 Signal Regiment (Satellite and Heavy Radio) moved onto the site and remained there until they were disbanded in 1977.

In 1987 the keep was sold to property developers for conversion into apartments and the rest of the site was developed as a housing estate. The site remains the home of the Worcester Norton Shooting Club.

References

Installations of the British Army
Barracks in England
Military history of Worcestershire